Daviesia divaricata, commonly known as marno, is a species of flowering plant in the family Fabaceae and is endemic to the south-west of Western Australia. It is a low, spreading or erect and bushy shrub with phyllodes reduced to small, triangular scales, and orange and maroon flowers.

Description

Taxonomy
Daviesia divaricata was first formally described in 1837 by botanist George Bentham in Stephan Endlicher's Enumeratio plantarum quas in Novae Hollandiae ora austro-occidentali ad fluvium Cygnorum et in sinu Regis Georgii collegit Carolus Liber Baro de Hügel. The specific epithet (divaricata) means "widely spreading".

In 2017, Michael Crisp and Gregory T. Chandler described two subspecies in Phytotaxa, and the names are accepted by the Australian Plant Census:

Distribution and habitat
Marno grows on sand, over both limestone and laterite in near-coastal sandplains and dunes from near the Hutt River to near Busselton. Subspecies lanulosa replaces the autonym in the north and occurs from near Walkaway to the Murchison River.

Conservation status
Both subspecies of Daviesia divaricata are classified as "not threatened" by the Western Australian Government Department of Biodiversity, Conservation and Attractions.

References

divaricata
Flora of Western Australia
Taxa named by George Bentham
Plants described in 1837